Dalenda Abdou, stage name of Khira Bent Abdelkader Gharbi (2 November 1928 – 29 June 2021), was a Tunisian actress.

Biography
Abdou began her career in the theatre in 1947 with the troupe Al Ittihad Al Masrahi de Béchir Rahal. She adopted the pseudonym of "Dalenda Abdou" after guidance from Béchir Rahal, a pioneer of Tunisian theatre and father of singer Oulaya. She played in several theatrical performances, such as The Two Orphans.

In 1951, Abdou made her debut with Radio Tunis, where she met actor and director Mongi Ben Yaïche. She began appearing in television shows, notably playing Hnani in Mhal Chahed. She often played old women on television, a character she was considered to have mastered.

Filmography

Cinema
 (1973)
El Icha (2010)
 (2014)

Television
El Douar (1992)
 (1996)
 (1999)
Hkeyet El Aroui (2006)
Salah w Sallouha (2007)
 by Slaheddine Essid (Guest of Honor of Episode 18 of Season 4) (2007): Aichoucha
 (2010)
 (2014)

References

1928 births
2021 deaths
Tunisian film actresses
Tunisian television actresses
People from Tunis
Deaths from the COVID-19 pandemic in Tunisia
20th-century Tunisian actresses
21st-century Tunisian actresses